Peder Henriksen (9 June 1890 – 9 November 1975) was a Norwegian footballer. He played in one match for the Norway national football team in 1915.

References

External links
 

1890 births
1975 deaths
Norwegian footballers
Norway international footballers
Place of birth missing
Association footballers not categorized by position